"Moments Like This" is the fourth single of the pop rock album Reamonn. It was recorded in 2008 by the German band Reamonn. The song is written by Rea Garvey, Uwe Bossert, Mike Gommeringer, Philipp Rauenbusch and Sebastian Padotzke.

Music video

The video was made in Munich in a Green Screen Studio for four weeks. The music in the video is a little bit different than the Album version.

The video is set in a fictitious world. All band members are seen in it. The video sometimes agrees with the songext: if “…like a bird on a wing.” is song, birds fly top down.

Track listing

Charts

Weekly charts

Year-end charts

References

External links
Official video at Universal Music

Reamonn songs
2009 singles
2008 songs
Song recordings produced by Julio Reyes Copello